Insaaf Ki Devi is a 1992 Indian Hindi action film, produced by B. S. Shaad and Shabnam Kapoor under the AMIT – BRAR Arts banner and directed by S. A. Chandrasekhar. It stars Jeetendra, Rekha  and music composed by Bappi Lahiri.

Plot
Inspector Santosh Verma a sincere cop leads a happy family with his wife Sadhana & daughter Gudiya. Vijay is a young charm convenient to their family who treats Sadhana as his sister. Just that perturbs Santosh is the short-temper of Sadhana and riot against injustice. Besides, Suraj Prakash, a crook is the husband of Sadhana's sister Seeta. He kills Seeta, escapes from the penalty with the support of a crafty advocate Kaanoonilal and suborned Inspector Ajay Singh. However, Sadhana does not stop therein. So, Suraj Prakash intrigues and slaughters Gudiya in front of Sadhana creating fake alibis when Kaanoonilal again acquits him as innocent. Now, Sadhana flares up with vengeance and starts her murder spree on the same path of fake alibis when Vijay aids her as a backbone. Knowing it, Santosh quits and challenges to apprehend her. After crossing many hurdles Sadhana accomplishes her aim. At that point, reformed Kaanoonilal appears as defense counsel and proves Sadhana guiltless. At last, Santosh also accepts her path as rectified. Finally, the movie ends by proclaiming Hail to the Justice.

Cast
Jeetendra as Inspector Santosh Verma 
Rekha as Sadhana Verma 
Shakti Kapoor as Suraj Prakash 
Kader Khan as Advocate Kaanoonilal 
Yograj Singh as Sub Inspector Ajay Singh   
Upasna Singh as Chandramukhi 
Sudha Chandran as Seeta 
Anju Mahendru as  Commissioner Geeta Mathur

Soundtrack 
Indeevar wrote all songs.

References

External links

1992 films
Indian action films
1990s Hindi-language films
Films scored by Bappi Lahiri
Films directed by S. A. Chandrasekhar
1992 action films